Winter Storage is a 1949 American animated short film produced by Walt Disney Productions and released by RKO Radio Pictures. Part of the Donald Duck series, the film stars Chip 'n' Dale who steal Donald's acorns while he is planting oak trees. It was directed by Jack Hannah and features the voices of Clarence Nash as Donald, and Jimmy MacDonald and Dessie Flynn as Chip and Dale.

Plot

Chip and Dale are not able to find enough acorns to store up for the winter due to all the acorns in the forest being picked. The chipmunks then see Donald Duck, working as a park ranger, beginning to seed a clearing in the oak forest. Seeing his large sack of acorns, they set out to steal it. They manage to make off with the entire sack (even after Dale tries to follow Donald's advice), but Donald who figures out the plot, easily takes it from them just as they enter the ground entrance to their tree, then places a box trap (baited with an acorn) which successfully ensnares both chipmunks despite Chip being fully aware of the ruse & them trying to get out of the mess. While the chipmunks argue with each other, Donald looks on amused and provokes them to fight.

Finally the chipmunks figure out his dirty tricks and run for the acorns. Donald stands in front of the tree entrance to keep the acorns from going inside. Chip and Dale then pick up hockey sticks. Using teamwork and natural hockey skills, the chipmunks beat Donald at his favorite sport, and finally flatten him with an overwhelming acorn "stampede", filling up the entire tree. A dazed Donald knocks at the door & hits in one last acorn at the chipmunks and laughs at them as if he has won the battle while they conclude that Donald has lost his mind.

Voice cast
Clarence Nash as Donald Duck
Jimmy MacDonald as Chip
Dessie Flynn as Dale

Home media
The short was released on December 11, 2007 on Walt Disney Treasures: The Chronological Donald, Volume Three: 1947-1950.

Additional releases include:
Have a Laugh Volume 1

References

External links
 Winter Storage on the official Disney website
 Winter Storage at the Encyclopedia of Animated Disney Shorts
 
 

Donald Duck short films
1940s Disney animated short films
Films directed by Jack Hannah
Films produced by Walt Disney
1949 animated films
1949 films
Films scored by Oliver Wallace
Chip 'n' Dale films